SpazzStick is a caffeinated lip balm. It was created by Richie Holschen, the only police officer in the remote Alaskan village of Kaktovik, who needed to protect his lips and remain alert in an area so cold that coffee freezes. When he first started making the product in 2004, he did so out of the police station.

References

Skin care brands
Caffeine